Convoy PQ 2 was the third of the Arctic Convoys of World War II by which the Western Allies supplied material aid to the Soviet Union in its fight with Nazi Germany. The convoy sailed from Liverpool on 13 October 1941 and arrived safely at Archangelsk on 30 October 1941.

Ships
The following information is from the Arnold Hague Convoy Database for the British ships.

Merchantmen

Escorts

References

 
 Convoy web

PQ 02